Guruvannapeta is a village situated in Komuravelli mandal and an MLA (Member of Legislative Assembly) constituency in the Siddipet district in the state of Telangana, India.

Size and population

Guruvannapeta is spread across  of land. There are approximately 600 houses. As per 1991 census, Guruvannapeta consists of 5,320 population.

Electores ( 2006 ):
Male   :  579
Female :  605
Total  :  1184

Economy

Agriculture is the primary source of income. There are no special minerals found in this region.

Education

Guruvannapeta has 1 primary school and 1 high school.

References

Villages in Siddipet district